France was one of the largest military powers to come under occupation as part of the Western Front in World War II. The Western Front was a military theatre of World War II encompassing Denmark, Norway, Luxembourg, Belgium, the Netherlands, the United Kingdom, France, Italy, and Germany. The Western Front was marked by two phases of large-scale combat operations.

The first phase saw the capitulation of the Netherlands, Belgium, and France during May and June 1940 after their defeat in the Low Countries and the northern half of France, and continued into an air war between Germany and Britain that climaxed with the Battle of Britain.

After capitulation, France was governed as Vichy France  headed by Marshal Philippe Pétain. From 1940 to 1942, while the Vichy regime was the nominal government of all of France except for Alsace-Lorraine, the Germans and Italians militarily occupied northern and south-eastern France. It was not until 1944 when France was liberated with the allied invasion restoring the French Government.

Topics

The following are articles about the topic of 'France during World War II:

Maginot Line and Alpine Line of fortifications and defences along the borders with Germany and Italy 
French declaration of war on Germany—17:00 on 3 September 1939
Phoney War, or drôle de guerre ("strange war"), the name given to the period of time in Western Europe from September 1939 to April 1940 when, after the blitzkrieg attack on Poland in September 1939, there was almost no fighting, and no bombs were dropped.
 Maxime Weygand,  commander-in-chief; little military activity between the defeat of Poland in October 1939 and April 1940.
Anglo-French Supreme War Council set up to organize a joint strategy against Germany
 The Battle of France in May and June 1940, in which the German victory led to the fall of the Third Republic .

Vichy France
Vichy France, the German client state established in June 1940 under in the non-occupied Zone libre, officially neutral and independent until invaded by the Axis in November 1942 
 Marshal Philippe Pétain, Vichy's main leader 
 Pierre Laval, head of government 1942-1944
Vichy French Air Force
Scuttling of the French fleet in Toulon 
Service du travail obligatoire - the provision of French citizens as forced labour in Germany
Axis occupation of France:
German occupation of France during World War II - 1940–1944 in the northern zones, and 1942–1944 in the southern zone
The Holocaust in France
Italian occupation of France during World War II - limited to border areas 1940–1942, almost all Rhône left-bank territory 1942-1943

Free France
 Charles de Gaulle, the main leader
Free France (La France Libre), the provisional government in London who controlled unoccupied and liberated territories, and the forces under its control (Forces françaises libres or FFL), fighting on the Allies' side after the Appeal of 18 June of its leader, General de Gaulle.
French Liberation Army (Armée française de la Libération) formed on 1 August 1943 by the merger of the FFL and all other Free French units, principally the Army of Africa
French Forces of the Interior (Forces françaises de l'intérieur) elements of the Resistance loyal to London and under its operational military command
Free French Air Force
Free French Naval Forces
French Resistance and the National Council of the Resistance which coordinated the various groups that made up the resistance
Japanese and Thai occupation of French Indochina - beginning with the Japanese invasion in September 1940 and with the Franco-Thai War which started in October 1940
Liberation of France
Operation Overlord - the invasion of northern France by the western Allies in June 1944
Operation Dragoon -  the invasion of southern France by the western Allies in August 1944
Liberation of Paris - the freeing of the French capital in August 1944 
Allied advance from Paris to the Rhine - advance (as the right flank of the western front) into Alsace-Lorraine in 1944
Western Allied invasion of Germany - invasion (as the right flank of the western front) of Baden-Württemberg in 1945

Further reading
 Kedward, Roderick. "France" in I.C.B. Dear and M.R.D. Foot, eds. The Oxford Companion to World War II (2003) pp 391–408. online at Oxford Reference.

 
World War II
World War II
World War II
Articles containing video clips
World War II
Military history of France during World War II